7th Armoured Brigade or 7th  Armored Brigade may refer to:

7th Armored Brigade (People's Republic of China)
7th Armoured Brigade (France)
7th Armored Brigade (Israel)
7th Armoured Brigade (United Kingdom)

See also
7th Armored (disambiguation)